The Liuchow Kwangsi Type 3  was a Chinese fighter prototype prior to the Second World War.

Development
Developed by Chee Wing Jeang, the Type 3 was a single-seat fighter biplane, the prototype of which was produced by Liuchow Mechanical and Aircraft Factory. It was of mixed construction with spruce and plywood wooden wings, welded steel tube fuselage and covered in fabric and plywood skinning. It was armed with one 7.7mm synchronised machine gun.

Operational history
The prototype was flown for the first time in July 1937. The poor performance of the aircraft resulted in no further development being carried out, although the prototype was delivered to the 32nd Squadron of the Chinese Air Force.

Operators

Specifications

See also

References

Further reading 

  

1930s Chinese fighter aircraft
Aircraft first flown in 1937